Amatonormativity is the set of societal assumptions that everyone prospers with an exclusive romantic relationship. Elizabeth Brake coined the neologism to capture societal assumptions about romance. Brake wanted to describe the pressure she received by many to prioritize marriage in her own life when she did not want to. Amatonormativity extends beyond social pressures for marriage to include general pressures involving romance.

Etymology
The word amatonormativity comes from amatus, which is the Latin word for "loved", and normativity, referring to societal norms. Another word which is similarly related to the word amatonormativity is amative. Merriam-Webster dictionary defines the word amative as: strongly moved by love and especially sexual love. Relating to or indicative of love. Amorous is a closely related word also derived from amatus. Related terms include allonormativity, which means a worldview that assumes all people experience sexual and romantic attraction, and compulsory sexuality, which means social norms and practices that marginalizes non-sexuality.

Examples
Elizabeth Brake describes the term as a pressure or desire for monogamy, romance, and/or marriage.
The desire to find relationships that are romantic, sexual, monogamous, and lifelong has many social consequences. People who are asexual, aromantic, and/or nonmonogamous become social oddities. According to researcher Bella DePaulo it puts a stigma on single people as incomplete and pushes romantic partners to stay in unhealthy relationships because of a fear the partners may have of being single.

According to Brake, one way in which this stigma is institutionally applied is the law and morality surrounding marriage. Loving friendships, queerplatonic, and other relationships are not given the same legal protections romantic partners are given through marriage. This legality also de-legitimizes the love and care found in other non-marital relationships.

Brake wrote a book, Minimizing Marriage, in which she defines amatonormativity as "the widespread assumption that everyone is better off in an exclusive, romantic, long-term coupled relationship, and that everyone is seeking such a relationship."

See also
Criticism of marriage
Discrimination against asexual people
Heteronormativity
Polyamory
Relationship anarchy
Aromanticism

References

Feminist terminology
Neologisms
Gender-related prejudices
Intimate relationships
Romance
Philosophy of love